Robert Coldwell Wood (September 16, 1923 – April 1, 2005) was an American political scientist, academic and government administrator, and professor of political science at MIT. From 1965 to 1969, Wood served as the Under Secretary of the Department of Housing and Urban Development under President Lyndon B. Johnson, and for two weeks as the Secretary at the end of the Johnson Administration.

After his return to MIT, he directed the Joint Center for Urban Studies at MIT and Harvard. He also had a joint appointment as chairman of the Massachusetts Bay Transportation Authority. He served as president of the University of Massachusetts (1970-1977), overseeing expansion of programs, including construction of a campus in south Boston.

Early life and career 
Wood was born on September 16, 1923 in St Louis, Missouri, the son of Mary (née Bradshaw) Wood and Thomas Frank Wood.  He won a scholarship to Princeton University, interrupting his studies during World War II to serve in the U.S. Army. Wood saw action during Battle of the Bulge, won a Bronze Star, and rose to the rank of sergeant.

After graduating from Princeton University, Wood earned three degrees from Harvard University: a master's in public administration, and a master's and a doctorate in government.

Wood taught political science at Massachusetts Institute of Technology from 1959 to 1965.  From 1965 to 1969, Wood served as the Under Secretary of the newly created Department of Housing and Urban Development under President Lyndon B. Johnson.

In 1968, Wood was awarded the Wiener Medal for Cybernetics from the American Society for Cybernetics. Following the resignation of Robert C. Weaver as Secretary of HUD, Wood served briefly in the position for two weeks before George Romney took office.

Wood returned to MIT, where he directed the Joint Center for Urban Studies at MIT and Harvard. At the same time, he was appointed as head of the Massachusetts Bay Transportation Authority (MBTA).

From 1970 to 1977 he served as president of the University of Massachusetts. During these years, Wood led the expansion of the university, to include UMass Medical Center in Worcester and its Boston campus. He also played a key role in bringing the John F. Kennedy Library and Museum to its site at Columbia Point, next to UMass-Boston. He also taught at Wesleyan University.

In 1978, Wood was chosen to serve as superintendent of Boston Public Schools. It was the first time since Franklin B. Dyer's hiring in 1912 that someone outside of Boston Public Schools was given the job of superintendent. He took over the district while it was in the midst of the busing crisis - a period in which the district was under a federal court order to desegregate. In 1980, the school committee voted to remove Wood from office, with anti-busing members John J. McDonough, Elvira "Pixie" Palladino, and Gerald O'Leary voting for his ouster and John D. O'Bryant and Jean Sullivan McKeigue opposing.

Personal life 
Wood married the former Margaret Byers, on March 22, 1952. They had three children, including the actor Frank Wood and the Governor of New Hampshire and U.S. Senator Maggie Hassan. Wood died from stomach cancer at his home in Boston, Massachusetts, on April 1, 2005.

Publications 
Wood's best-known books are: 
 1958. Suburbia: Its People and Their Politics
 1959. Metropolis against Itself.
 1961. 1400 Governments; The Political Economy of the New York Metropolitan Region. With Vladimir V. Almendinger.
 1972. The Necessary Majority: Middle America and the Urban Crisis
 1993. Whatever Possessed the President? Academic Experts and Presidential Policy, 1960-88.
 1995. Turnabout Time: Public Higher Education in the Commonwealth. With Richard A. Hogarty and Aundrea E. Kelley.

References

External links 
 Professor, HUD chief Robert Wood dies. MIT April 6, 2005.
 An Inventory of His Personal Papers In the John F. Kennedy Library.

|-

|-

1923 births
2005 deaths
20th-century American politicians
United States Army personnel of World War II
American political scientists
Cyberneticists
Deaths from stomach cancer
Harvard Kennedy School alumni
Lyndon B. Johnson administration cabinet members
Massachusetts Bay Transportation Authority people
Presidents of the University of Massachusetts system
Scientists from St. Louis
United States Secretaries of Housing and Urban Development
Wesleyan University faculty
Princeton University alumni
MIT School of Humanities, Arts, and Social Sciences faculty
Boston Public Schools superintendents
United States Army officers
Deaths from cancer in Massachusetts
20th-century political scientists